The De Mond Nature Reserve, in the Overberg between Struisbaai and Arniston, Western Cape, South Africa has been a Ramsar site wetland since 1986.

Shifting dunes block the river's mouth and serve as a breeding ground for various species of birds. The area is also a habitat for reptiles, crustaceans, and seahorses.

It is composed of different coastal vegetation communities, including dune milkwood forests and salt marshes making up the estuarine environment.

References

Nature reserves in South Africa
Ramsar sites in South Africa